Sault Ste. Marie is a city in Ontario, Canada. The third-largest city in Northern Ontario after Sudbury and Thunder Bay, it is located on the St. Mary's River on the Canada–US border. To the southwest, across the river, is the United States and the Michigan city of the same name. The two cities are joined by the Sault Ste. Marie International Bridge, which connects Interstate 75 on the Michigan side and Huron Street (and former Ontario Secondary Highway 550B) on the Ontario side. Shipping traffic in the Great Lakes system bypasses the Saint Mary's Rapids via the American Soo Locks, the world's busiest canal in terms of tonnage that passes through it, while smaller recreational and tour boats use the Canadian Sault Ste. Marie Canal.

The Ojibwe, the indigenous Anishinaabe inhabitants of the area, call this area , meaning "place of the rapids." They used this as a regional meeting place during whitefish season in the St. Mary's Rapids (the anglicized form of this name, Bawating, is used in institutional and geographic names in the area). Hundreds of years ago, this slowed shipping traffic, requiring an overland portage of boats and cargo from one lake to the other. The entire name translates to 'Saint Mary's Rapids' or 'Saint Mary's Falls'. Residents of the city are called Saultites.

Sault Ste. Marie is bordered to the east by the Rankin Reserve (of Batchewana First Nation) and Garden River First Nation reserves, and to the west by Prince Township. To the north, the city is bordered by an unincorporated portion of Algoma District, which includes the local services boards of Aweres, Batchawana Bay, Goulais and District, Peace Tree and Searchmont. The city's census agglomeration, including the townships of Laird, Prince and Macdonald, Meredith and Aberdeen Additional and the First Nations reserves of Garden River and Rankin, had a total population of 79,800 in 2011.

Native American settlements, mostly of Ojibwe-speaking peoples, existed here for more than 500 years. In the late 17th century, French Jesuit missionaries established a mission at the First Nations village. This was followed by development of a fur trading post and larger settlement, as traders, trappers and Native Americans were attracted to the community. It was considered one community and part of Canada until after the War of 1812 and settlement of the border between Canada and the US at the St. Mary's River. At that time, the US prohibited British traders from operating in its territory any longer, and the areas separated by the river began to develop as two communities, both named Sault Ste. Marie.

History

Early history
After the visit of Étienne Brûlé in 1623, the French called it Sault de Gaston in honour of Gaston, Duke of Orléans, the brother of King Louis XIII of France.

In 1668, French Jesuit missionaries renamed it as Sault Sainte-Marie, and established a mission settlement (present-day Sault Ste. Marie, Michigan) on the river's south bank.

Later, a fur trading post was established and the settlement expanded to include both sides of the river.  Sault Ste. Marie is one of the oldest French settlements in North America.  It was at the crossroads of the  fur trade route, which stretched from Montreal to Sault Ste. Marie and to the North country above Lake Superior. A cosmopolitan, mixed population of Europeans, First Nations peoples, and Métis lived at the village spanning the river.

The city name originates from Saults de Sainte-Marie, archaic French for "Saint Mary's Falls", a reference to the rapids of Saint Marys River. Etymologically, the word sault comes from an archaic spelling of saut (from sauter), which translates most accurately in this usage to the English word cataract.  This in turn derives from the French word for "leap" or "jump" (similar to somersault). Citations dating back to 1600 use the sault spelling to mean a cataract, waterfall or rapids. In modern French, however, the words chutes or rapides are more usual. Sault survives almost exclusively in geographic names dating from the 17th century. (See also Long Sault, Ontario, Sault St. Louis, Quebec, and Grand Falls/Grand-Sault, New Brunswick, three other place names where "sault" also carries this meaning.)

Traders regularly interacted with tribes from around the Great Lakes, and Scots-British fur trader John Johnston, his Ojibwe wife and multi-racial children were prominent among all societies here in the late eighteenth century. Their daughter, Jane Johnston Schoolcraft married Henry Rowe Schoolcraft, a US Indian agent and early ethnographer, and they had children. She has been recognized as the first Native American poet and writer in the United States.

War of 1812 and aftermath
This fluid environment changed during and after the War of 1812 between Britain and the United States. Trade dropped during the war and on July 20, 1814, an American force destroyed the North West Company depot on the north shore of the St. Marys River. Since the Americans were unable to capture Fort Mackinac, the British forces retained control of Sault Ste. Marie. As noted, after the war with a new border defined, the US closed its territory to British Canadian traders, shutting off much interaction.

In 1870, the United States refused to give the steamer Chicona, carrying Colonel Garnet Wolseley, permission to pass through the locks at Sault Ste Marie. In order to control their own water passage, the Canadians constructed the Sault Ste. Marie Canal, which was completed in 1895.

Canadian Pacific Railway

Sault Ste. Marie had been a target for railway expansion since the early 1880s, and there was considerable disagreement within the business consortium assembled to build the Canadian Pacific Railway as to whether or not to route its transcontinental line through it. The symbolic "first spike" of the railway had been driven at Bonfield, Ontario in Nipissing District in 1881, and construction had been proceeding westward. The American railway magnate James J. Hill, nicknamed the "Empire Builder", supported a route through Sault Ste. Marie, which would allow for both a "water bridge" to the head of Lake Superior at Thunder Bay and an all-rail connection to the west via American railways in the Midwest, benefiting Hill's St Paul, Minneapolis and Manitoba Railroad. Simultaneously, there were political considerations around the railway as a nation-building project coupled with fears of American expansionism. During the Red River Rebellion, the Wolseley expedition had left Toronto in May 1870 and only arrived at Fort Garry, Manitoba by August, with American control of the Sault Ste. Marie locks providing a potential impediment to future military transportation within Canada. An all-Canadian rail route would bypass this.

A CPR line was surveyed and gradually constructed along the north shore of Lake Huron, cutting through the La Cloche Mountains, while the Central Ontario-based Midland Railway of Canada also surveyed its own line, but became insolvent and collapsed shortly after. The Northern Railway of Canada, which had pushed northward from Toronto to Lake Simcoe, sought to push further to North Bay and then cut west under a subsidiary called the Northern, North-Western, and Sault Ste. Marie Railway, competing directly with the CPR. It also collapsed and ultimately the line terminated at a junction with the CPR line south of North Bay, named Nipissing Junction.

Throughout the abrupt rise and fall of these competing projects, CPR construction had slowly marched westward under engineer James Worthington. By 1884, however, changes had occurred in CPR management with the rise of William Cornelius Van Horne, who would later become the company's president. Both Hill and Worthington resigned from the company, and Hill became a bitter opponent of it. A new transcontinental mainline through Northern Ontario, passing directly through the interior and bypassing the lakeshore settlements along Lake Huron (including Sault Ste. Marie), was laid out and constructed from a point on the line which became known as Sudbury Junction. This junction point became a small CPR town, and with the discovery of vast mineral resources in the Sudbury Basin during the construction of this transcontinental line north of the junction, mining activity in the Sudbury area grew explosively, leading to the creation of Sudbury District in 1894 and shifting economic focus away from Sault Ste. Marie. The original CPR line (by then known as the CPR Algoma Branch), which had laid dormant until 1888, was finally reactivated and completed through to Sault Ste. Marie, joining with the St Paul, Minneapolis and Manitoba Railroad via the joint Sault Ste. Marie International Railroad Bridge.

Sault Ste. Marie, Ontario was incorporated as a town in 1888, but its economy stagnated toward the end of the 19th century with the decline of the fur trade.

20th century
The town gained brief international notoriety in 1911 in the trial of Angelina Napolitano, the first person in Canada to use the battered woman defence for murder. It was incorporated as a city in the following year of 1912.

During World War II, and particularly after the US was attacked at Pearl Harbor in 1941, government concern turned to protection of the locks and shipping channel at Sault Ste. Marie. A substantial military presence was established to protect the locks from a possible attack by Nazi German aircraft from the north. The recent development of long-range bombers increased fears of a sudden air raid. Military strategists studied polar projection maps, which indicated that the air distance from occupied Norway to the town was about the same as the distance from Norway to New York.

A joint Canadian and US committee called the "Permanent Joint Board on Defence" drove the installation of anti-aircraft defence and associated units of the United States Army Air Forces and Royal Canadian Air Force to defend the locks. Marie on the shores of Lake Superior. Barrage balloons were installed, and early warning radar bases were established at five locations in northern Ontario (Kapuskasing, Cochrane, Hearst, Armstrong (Thunder Bay District), and Nakina) to watch for incoming aircraft. Military personnel were established to guard sensitive parts of the transportation infrastructure. A little over one year later, in January 1943, most of these facilities and defences were deemed excessive and removed, save a reduced military base at Sault Ste. Marie.

The first Algerine-class minesweeper in the Royal Canadian Navy was named HMCS Sault Ste. Marie (J334) after the city. It was laid down in 1942 and acted as a convoy escort in the Battle of the Atlantic.

On January 29, 1990, Sault Ste. Marie became a flashpoint in the Meech Lake Accord constitutional debate when council passed a resolution declaring English as the city's official language and the sole language for provision of municipal services. French speakers had already gained the use of French as an official language for government services. The city had a sizable French-speaking population and these residents objected strongly to the council's action. The Sault Ste. Marie language resolution was not the first of its kind in Ontario, but the municipality was the largest to have passed such a resolution and the first to do so despite its sizable Franco-Ontarian population.

Climate
Sault Ste. Marie has a humid continental climate (Köppen climate classification Dfb) with cold, snowy winters and warm humid summers that are moderated to some extent by Lake Superior. Winters are cold and very snowy usually beginning in mid-late November and lasting until early April. Temperatures drop below  just over 26 days per year. Summers are warm and humid with mild nights. Temperatures above  occur 12 days per year. The highest temperature ever recorded in Sault Ste.

Economy

The city developed considerable industry before and after World War II, especially in steel-making. Algoma (formerly  Algoma Steel; Essar Steel Algoma) is the largest single employer, with 3,500 employees at the main plant and approximately 553 (440 unionized and 113 non-unionized) at an adjacent tube mill operated by Tenaris. During the 1940s, the steel and chromium operations were of substantial importance to the war effort in Canada and the United States. Algoma Steel and the Chromium Mining and Smelting Corporation were key producers for transportation and military machines.

The Huron Central Railway has been important into the 21st century to the steel operation, despite extensive railway restructuring elsewhere. Genesee & Wyoming, owner of the railway,  announced its intention to discontinue operations. It continued to operate under an agreement which terminated on August 15, 2010.

Sault Ste. Marie prospered during the 1960s and '70s, but as imported steel began to compete with domestic production, the local industry began to contract. Since the late 1980s, Algoma has declared bankruptcy twice and laid off large numbers of workers, adversely affecting the regional economy. Algoma was bailed out by the Ontario government with interest-free loans. The company had a swift turnaround in 2004 from its earlier financial troubles of the 1990s. China's increased demand for steel of the past decade has increased the price of steel. Denis Turcotte, CEO, was named "Canadian CEO of the year" in 2006 for his efforts. An offer to purchase ASI by the Essar Group (India) had been recommended by the ASI Board of Directors and was approved. The company was officially sold to the Essar Group in June 2007 for $1.6 billion.

Forestry is also a major local industry. St. Mary's Paper has been closed and decommissioned, although it was reopened in June 2007 and operated for a time under new ownership. Also related to wood products is ARAUCO, which employs over 110 people in the community. An adjacent melamine factory manufactures products with ARAUCO's materials. Examples are furniture and cupboards where a finish is added to the product. Together both of ARAUCO's factories employ about 150 people. The Huron Central Railway is important to these local industries as well.

The business process outsourcing industry had three call centres in the city, which together employed about 1,500 people. The largest, Sutherland Global Services, closed in 2019 and Agero closed in April 2020. Nucomm previously had a call centre here as well. The call centre industry became a major source of jobs and had contributed to the economic turnaround of the city in the late 1990s.

Another large employer in the community is the Ontario Lottery and Gaming Corporation (OLG). The OLG has a corporate office located on the waterfront. It employs a total of about 900 people in Sault Ste. Marie between the corporate office and OLG Casino Sault Ste. Marie. The prize centre used to be administered in the city but this operation was moved back to Toronto (York Mills) in 2009. The OLG is still the fourth-largest employer, after Algoma Steel, Sault Area Hospital, and the call centre industry.

Sault Ste. Marie is one of only a few cities in Ontario where a municipal bylaw prevents stores from opening on December 26, the day after Christmas, which is a Commonwealth holiday known as Boxing Day. Retail stores in Sault Ste. Marie begin their post-Christmas Boxing Day sales on December 27. A municipal referendum to determine whether voters favour allowing stores to open on Boxing Day was held concurrently with the 2010 municipal election. Voter turnout was not high enough to make the referendum legally binding, but 60.77 per cent of voters opposed allowing stores to open on the holiday.

Alternative energy
The Sault Ste. Marie Solar Park (68 MW), co-generation plant (Brookfield Power), F. H. Clergue Hydroelectric Generating Station, nearby Prince Township Wind Farm (189 MW) and several nearby hydroelectric dams, form part of the city's push to develop alternative forms of energy and gain the title of 'Alternative Energy Capital of North America'. Two other wind farms are proposed for the area: the Goulais wind farm (25 MW) and the Bow Lake wind farm (58 MW), in partnership with the Batchewana First Nation of Ojibways to be built near Montreal River Harbour. Elementa Group has built a pilot waste-to-energy plant in Sault Ste. Marie, and the local Public Utilities Commission (PUC) collects methane gas from the city's landfill. The city's street lights fully utilize LED technology and as recently as 2021, there has been progress made as the city has begun to budget for the purchase of electric vehicles, starting in 2022, to replace their fleet of gasoline powered vehicles. Sault Ste. Marie is also the location of the headquarters of Heliene, a solar energy equipment manufacturer. In 2021, Sault Ste. Marie and the PUC began construction and modification on the city's power grid, along with Overland Contracting Canada—the project is budgeted to cost $34m CAD and is called the Sault Smart Grid Project (SSG Project), the project is the first of its kind to be implemented on a community wide scale in Canada and utilizes new technologies which will optimize voltage, automate distribution, and will incorporate advanced metering infrastructure; the SSG Project is expected to reduce electricity costs for residential and commercial customers of the PUC and will assist in reducing the frequency and length of power outages through immediate location of outages and increased reliability of the power supply, it will also allow for efficient additions to the power grid in the future. The project is expected to be completed by the end of 2022.

Transportation

Sault Ste. Marie is served by Highway 17, designated as a segment of the Trans-Canada Highway in the region. The highway connects the city to Thunder Bay to the northwest and Sudbury to the east; the northern and eastern entrances to the city via Highway 17 are monitored by the Sault Ste. Marie Police Service with new cameras, scanning license plates upon entry/exit of the city—however as of April 2022, they are not yet fully operational. The International Bridge connects downtown Sault Ste. Marie to Sault Ste. Marie, Michigan, becoming Interstate 75 on the American side. Interstate 75 continues south to Saginaw, Flint, and Detroit before crossing into Ohio, eventually terminating in Hialeah, Florida, near Miami, and becoming toll roads SR 924 and SR 826.

The International Bridge also directs traffic from the American side of the border via Sault Ste. Marie's transport route, which runs from the International Bridge, travels along Carmen's Way to Second Line East, and then meets with Great Northern Road (Highway 17), where transports can either turn left to go north, towards Thunder Bay, or continue straight to go east, towards Sudbury. The section from Second Line East to Great Northern Road is also known as Ontario Highway 550, which runs from Great Northern Road and Second Line East to a roundabout in Gros Cap, the highway loops around the Sault Ste. Marie Public Utilities Commissions' water intake building. This newer limited-access roadway, known as "Carmen's Way" and named after the late MP Carmen Provenzano, has made it easier for transport trucks to reach Highway 17 and other major area roads. The route of Carmen's Way has a wide grassy right-of-way on both sides of the roadway, to facilitate future expansion of its lane capacity. Planning was underway to eventually connect the Second Line East and Black Road intersection to the new four-lane section of Highway 17, which opened east of the city in 2007—however as of 2022, there has been no environmental impact assessment initiated by the Ministry of Transportation.

The city plays an inherited role in marine transportation, with the locks in Michigan being an integral component of the St. Lawrence Seaway. The city operates its own small-scale lock which is used by small boats and other pleasure craft in the summer. Also recently opened is a multi-modal terminal designed to take advantage of the Sault as a rail, road, and water transportation hub. Cruise ships often dock at Roberta Bondar Park, which includes a large pavilion, small farmers market, a BeaverTails outlet, a small canteen, a marina, public washrooms, a Roberta Bondar statue, and green space; located to the right (looking at the city from the waterfront) is Montana's and the newly renovated City Hall, and to the left, Delta Sault Ste. Marie Waterfront and the Station Mall.

Sault Ste. Marie is also served by Sault Ste. Marie Airport and Sault Transit Services. The city is no longer connected by passenger rail to any other major cities, but is part of the Algoma Central Railway network, which runs north from the city to the small town of Hearst. In 2006 the city's Member of Parliament, Tony Martin, called for passenger rail service to be reinstated between Sault Ste. Marie and Sudbury.

In 2018, Ontario Northland announced a major service expansion west of Sudbury, which includes multiple stops in Sault Ste. Marie. Passengers may board buses headed toward Hearst, Sudbury, or Manitoulin Island. ONTC currently has three stops in the city, with the main stop being along Trunk Road in the east end, and the other stops being at Sault College and the hospital.

Sault Ste. Marie does not have Lyft or Uber, but has three ridesharing companies that focus on small communities called URide, EZ Ride and Driverseat. The city has taxi services offered by Hollywood Airport Shuttle & Limousines, Soo Yellow Cab, and UCab.

Tourism
Local area attractions include the Canadian Bushplane Heritage Centre, Entomica Insectarium, the Sault Ste. Marie Museum, the Sault Ste. Marie Canal National Historic Site, boat tours of the Sault locks (which connect Lake Superior with the lower Great Lakes), Whitefish Island, the Ermatinger Clergue National Historic Site, Casino Sault Ste. Marie, the Art Gallery of Algoma and the Algoma Central Railway's popular Agawa Canyon Tour Train.

The MS Norgoma, a Canadian passenger ship, was a museum ship in the Great Lakes at Sault Ste. Marie. This ship is no longer docked in Sault Ste. Marie.

Nearby parks include Pancake Bay Provincial Park, Batchawana Bay Provincial Park and Lake Superior Provincial Park. Winter activities are also an asset to Sault Ste Marie's tourism industry with the annual Bon Soo Winter Carnival, Searchmont Resort as a great ski and snowboard destination, Stokely Creek Lodge (cross country ski resort) and Hiawatha a nearby cross country ski trails. The city also hosts a large snowmobile trail system that criss-crosses the province of Ontario.

A new non-motorized HUB trail, named the John Rowswell Hub Trail, was built around the city so that walkers, rollerbladers and cyclists (snowshoeing and cross country skiing in winter) can enjoy the beautiful and convenient circle tour around town. The Voyageur Hiking Trail, a long-distance trail that will eventually span from Sudbury to Thunder Bay, originated in Sault Ste. Marie in 1973. The Roberta Bondar Park and Pavilion, most famous for its unique tent design, was created to commemorate the first Canadian female astronaut to go into space and regularly hosts community events; the parking lot has spaces for farmers market vendors and the pavilion also has a BeaverTails, a canteen, and overlooks the St. Mary's River. The park is often most active in the spring and summer and is located in between Montana's and Delta Sault Ste. Marie Waterfront, with the Roberta Bondar Place directly to the North, which consists of the OLG headquarters and other provincial government offices.

Sault Ste. Marie has an extensive mountain biking network and has invested in new trails in the Hiawatha area of the city. The Algoma Trail Network plans to add more trails to the existing  network, with initial work being completed by September 2021.

In August 2021, Sail Superior ran tours of their Zodiac Hurricane boat with tours departing from the Roberta Bondar marina.

One of the major draws to the area from the months of June to October is the Agawa Canyon Tour Train. This one-day wilderness excursion travels 114 miles north of Sault Ste. Marie, alongside pristine northern lakes and rivers and through the awesome granite rock formations and vast mixed forests of the Canadian Shield, eventually ending at the Agawa Canyon. The train departs at 8am and returns to Sault Ste. Marie by 6pm. In August 2021 a new train station was opened for the tour train, the Canal district of the city.

The city is also home to the Station Mall, one of the largest shopping malls in Northern Ontario.

In 2020, Sault Ste. Marie city council voted in favour of developing a downtown plaza, located between Spring and Brock Street—the plaza will eliminate Bingham Street and will eventually form a large common area with a fountain/skating surface, restrooms and changing rooms, a large screen, event space, a Tim Hortons (located in existing building), and the Mill Market, with other businesses and attractions expected to open as a result of development. The plaza has already started to increase and stimulate development in the area, with a new $16 million office building being constructed nearby. The space will also include retail units and is largely modeled after similar concepts such as the Market Square in Guelph, or Pat Bayly Square in Ajax. Construction on the plaza is expected to start in Spring 2022 and will be completed likely by 2023. The plaza has been the subject of controversy throughout its planning stages as some citizens feel it isn't needed and is too costly; the plaza was part of the array of suggestions made by Roger Brooks—a tourism and city centre consultant hired through a conjoined effort between the city and downtown association in 2018.

Demographics

In the 2021 Census of Population conducted by Statistics Canada, Sault Ste.

The city's census agglomeration had a total population of 76,731, down 1.8% from 78,159 in 2016

Sault Ste. Marie was at one time a haven for Italian immigrants. The city has a large concentration of ethnic Italians for a community its size, mostly descending from the southern region of Calabria.

Those who are of European origin constitute 82% of the population, Aboriginals or Native Canadians, constitute 13.5%, and visible minorities make up 4.5%.

In 2019, the Government of Canada began an immigration program, called the Rural and Northern Immigration Pilot, which is designed to spread immigration of skilled workers throughout northern communities. North Bay, Sudbury, Timmins, and Thunder Bay are also included in the program, along with other northern communities in other provinces.

Government

The Corporation of the City of Sault Ste. Marie is run by a city council of 10 councillors (representing five wards) and a mayor. The most recent municipal election was held on October 22, 2018, and the mayoralty was won by incumbent Christian Provenzano, who garnered 70.15% of the vote.

Provenzano's predecessor, Debbie Amaroso, was the first woman elected to this office.

The city's crest contains the words "Ojibwa Kitche Gumeeng Odena" (from Ojibwe gichi-gamiing oodena) which means "Town by the large body of water of the Ojibwe" (or simply "Town by Lake Superior") in the Ojibwe language.

The city is served by the Sault Ste. Marie federal electoral district and the Sault Ste. Marie provincial electoral district. The boundaries of these two districts are not identical; the provincial district encompasses the city alone, while the federal district includes the neighbouring Garden River and Rankin reserves, and extends northerly to the Montreal River. The city's current federal Member of Parliament is Terry Sheehan (Liberal), and its seat in the provincial legislature is Ross Romano (Conservative).

See also Neighbourhoods in Sault Ste. Marie, Ontario.

Education

The city is home to Sault College, a college of applied arts and technology, and to Algoma University. While the vast majority of programs at Algoma University and Sault College are delivered on the respective campuses, both institutions also offer joint programs with Lake Superior State University in Sault Ste. Marie, Michigan. On June 18, 2008, Algoma University became an independent university, ending its longtime affiliation with Laurentian University in Sudbury. A new school, Shingwauk Kinoomaage Gamig (University), is poised to launch as a federated school of Algoma University. It will offer courses in Anishinaabe culture and language.

Sault Ste. Marie is home to the Algoma District School Board and to the Huron-Superior Catholic District School Board. It is part of the Conseil scolaire de district du Grand Nord de l'Ontario and the Conseil scolaire de district catholique du Nouvel-Ontario. It is also home to the following high schools:

 Korah Collegiate & Vocational School (English, public, offers the International Baccalaureate Programme)
 École Notre-Dame-du-Sault (French, Catholic)
 St. Mary's College (English with French Immersion Program, Catholic, offers Advanced Placement programs)
 Superior Heights Collegiate & Vocational School (English and French Immersion, public, offers Advanced Placement programs)
 White Pines Collegiate & Vocational School (English, public)

Sault Ste. Marie is also home to the Ontario Forest Research Institute and the federal Great Lakes Forestry Centre.

Sault Ste. Marie has over 30 elementary schools.

Sports

The Sault Ste. Marie Greyhounds are the city's most recognized sports team having existed since the formation of the Northern Ontario Hockey Association in 1919.  The Hounds won national championships twice including the 1993 Memorial Cup and the 1924 Allan Cup. The Greyhounds play in the GFL Memorial Gardens, a state-of-the-art downtown arena that replaced the Sault Memorial Gardens in 2006. The current Hounds have retired five jerseys since joining the Ontario Hockey League in 1972:  #1 John Vanbiesbrouck, #4 Craig Hartsburg, #10 Ron Francis, #5 Adam Foote, and #99 Wayne Gretzky.

Sault Ste. Marie also had a team in hockey's first professional league. The Sault Ste. Marie Marlboros or 'Canadian Soo' team played in the International Professional Hockey League from 1904 to 1907.

Sault Ste. Marie hockey teams have boasted a number of Hockey Hall of Fame members, including Sault natives or residents Phil Esposito, Tony Esposito, Ron Francis, and Didier Pitre, as well as Sault team members Gerry Cheevers, Paul Coffey, Bill Cook, Bun Cook, Wayne Gretzky, Newsy Lalonde, George McNamara, and Marty Walsh.

National Hockey League All-Stars Joe Thornton & Jeff Carter played their entire OHL careers as members of the Greyhounds. Current NHL players from the Sault Ste. Marie area include New Jersey Devils centre Tyler Kennedy, Buffalo Sabres centre Jordan Nolan, St.Louis Blues centre Chris Thorburn and Vegas Golden Knights defense Colin Miller

Sault Ste. Marie native Paul Maurice is the current coach of the NHL's Florida Panthers, and has been a head coach for parts of 25 seasons with the Hartford/Carolina franchise, Toronto Maple Leafs, Winnipeg Jets, and the Panthers, becoming the league's youngest ever coach at the age of 28 in 1995, and taking Carolina to the Stanley Cup Finals in 2002. Notably, former Greyhound player and coach Ted Nolan coached parts of 5 seasons in the NHL with the Buffalo Sabres & the New York Islanders, winning the Jack Adams Trophy as the NHL Coach of the Year in 1998 with the Sabres.

Sault Ste. Marie was the host of the 1990 Brier, the Canadian men's curling championship. In 2010, it hosted the Scotties Tournament of Hearts, which serves as Canada's women's curling championship. At the 2013 Tim Hortons Brier held in Edmonton, Alberta, Brad Jacobs and his team from the Soo Curlers Association won the Tim Hortons Brier, and the honour of representing Canada in the 2013 Ford World Men's Curling Championship, where they won silver. The team later won the 2013 Canadian Olympic Curling Trials, earning them the right to represent Canada at the 2014 Winter Olympics, where they won gold. The local curling clubs are the Soo Curlers Association and the Tarentorus Curling Club.

Sault Ste. Marie also has a rich history in Canadian football. For nearly four decades, Sault Ste. Marie high schools have consistently won Northern Ontario honours (NOSSA) and are regular participants in provincial finals. Sault Ste. Marie has also had men's semi-pro football since 1972. The Sault Steelers are 4x National Semi-Pro champions in the Canadian Major Football League, winning the honours in 1972, 2007, 2009, and 2010. The Steelers failed to field a team in the early 1990s before returning for 4 seasons as the Sault Storm, later going back to their original name in the 2000s on their way to forming a Dynasty between 2007 and 2010. Notable names associated with the team are Len Monico (builder and coach), Don McBain (owner/president), Barry Rushon (championship coach), and Brandon Lewis (League MVP and 20x All-Star).

Other notable athletes from Sault Ste. Marie include Canadian Football Hall of Fame inductee Rocky Dipietro, Paralympic swimmer Jessica Tuomela, softball pitcher Darren Zack, and mixed martial artist Antonio Carvalho.

The Sault has been host to many national and international sporting events, including the 2003 Eco-Challenge North American Championship, an expedition-length adventure race through unmarked wilderness by biking, trekking, paddling and using ropes.

Walk of Fame

The Walk of Fame was created in 2006 as a joint project between the city of Sault Ste. Marie and its Downtown Association, and honours those from the city or the Algoma District who have made outstanding contributions to the community or significant contributions in their chosen field of work. Inductees are added on an annual basis.

Culture
Sault Ste. Marie is home to the Bon Soo winter carnival, held every February. The city also hosts the annual Algoma Fall Festival which draws local and international performing artists. The Kiwanis Community Theatre and the landmark Central United Church are used for the performances. Both venues hold approximately 1,000 people. The Art Gallery of Algoma features an extensive collection of local and international artists' work and presents regular exhibitions. Residents celebrate Community Day on the third weekend of July. The local Rotary International club organizes a three-day event called Rotaryfest.

Sault Ste. Marie was the focus of Kalle Mattson's "A Love Song to the City", whose music video premiered on USA Today.

Notable people
 Brigitte Acton, two-time Olympian alpine skier
 Michael Amadio NHL player for the Vegas Golden Knights
 David Amber, NHL on Sportsnet reporter and anchor
 Ivan Boldirev, retired NHL centre and 1978 NHL All-Star
 Roberta Bondar, neurologist and the first Canadian female astronaut in space
 Antonio Carvalho, mixed martial artist and UFC veteran
 Treble Charger, Juno Award-nominated alternative rock band
 Kerry Diotte, journalist and member of parliament
 Kyle Dubas, general manager of the Toronto Maple Leafs
 Steve Wochy, former NHL player and the second player in its history to become a Centenarian
 Phil Esposito, Hockey Hall of Fame inductee, 10th all-time NHL goal scorer, and winner of two    Stanley Cups
 Tony Esposito, Hockey Hall of Fame inductee and winner of one Stanley Cup
 Aaron Fiacconi, retired CFL offensive lineman
 Ron Francis, 5th All-Time leading scorer in the NHL and winner of two Stanley Cups
 William Howard Hearst, seventh premier of Ontario
 Kevin Hodson, retired NHL goalie and winner of one Stanley Cup & one Memorial Cup
 Brad Jacobs, E. J. Harnden, Ryan Harnden, Canadian curlers, 2014 Winter Olympic gold medalists and 2013 Tim Hortons Brier champions.
 Bill Johnson, Sault Ste. Marie resident unjustly convicted of murder; acquitted in 2007
 The Right Honourable David Johnston CC CMM COM CD FRSC(hon) FRCPSC(hon), 28th Governor General of Canada
 Sharon Johnston CC DStJ, Viceregal Consort to The Right Honourable David Johnston &  Honorary Captain of the Royal Canadian Navy
 Lila Kedrova, Academy Award winning actress
 Tyler Kennedy, retired NHL player
 Keith Knight, film actor
 Jerry Korab, retired defenceman for the National Hockey League from 1971 to 1985
 Chico Maki, retired NHL player
 Wayne Maki, former NHL player
 Mac Marcoux, visually-impaired alpine skier and gold medal winner at the 2014 Winter Paralympics
 Kalle Mattson, folk rock musician
 Paul Maurice, current head coach of the NHL's Florida Panthers
 Bob McKenzie, TSN hockey broadcaster & analyst
 Colin Miller, NHL player currently playing for the Dallas Stars
 Will Morin, politician and former leader of First Peoples National Party
 Jordan Nolan, NHL player currently playing for the St. Louis Blues
 Ted Nolan, former NHL player and head coach
 John Parco, retired hockey player and member of the Italian men's hockey team at the 2006 Winter Olympics
 Didier Pitre, Hockey Hall of Fame inductee and winner of one Stanley Cup
 Crystal Shawanda, Juno Award winning country singer
 Ray Smillie, bronze medal-winning boxer at the 1928 Summer Olympics
 Lyndon Slewidge, anthem singer for the Ottawa Senators & retired policeman
 Chris Thorburn, retired NHL player
 Jessica Tuomela, visually impaired swimmer and silver medallist at the 2000 Summer Paralympics
 Marty Turco, retired NHL goalie and member of the 2006 Winter Olympics men's hockey team
 Gene Ubriaco, retired NHL player, former AHL coach and coach of the Pittsburgh Penguins and current Senior Advisor/Director of Hockey Operations for the Chicago Wolves of the American Hockey League
 Brian Vallée, author, journalist, filmmaker
 Dennis Vial, retired NHL player who mainly played for the Ottawa Senators

Media

Sister cities

County Louth, Ireland
Forssa, Finland
Maia, Portugal
Sault Ste. Marie, Michigan, United States (also twin city)

References

External links

 
1668 establishments in New France
Cities in Ontario
Hudson's Bay Company trading posts
Populated places on the Great Lakes
Single-tier municipalities in Ontario